Antônio Luís Pereira da Cunha, first and only viscount of Inhambupe de Cima and marquis of Inhambupe (Salvador, Bahia, Brazil 6 April 1760 — Rio de Janeiro, 19 September 1837), was a Brazilian magistrate (juiz de fora), appellate judge (desembargador) and politician.

Biography 
His father was Bartolomeu Pereira da Silva; his mother, Ana da Cunha Barbosa. His first wife was Isabel Joaquina de Assis; around 1789, he married Erculana Felizarda Figueira (died 1796); after her death, on December 13, 1801, in Lisbon, he married Maria Joaquina Gerleu da Rocha Dantas e Mendonça (1785–1861), with whom he had three children: Lourenço de Assis, Manoel Luiz and Marianna. He was the brother of Pedro Augusto Nolasco Pereira da Cunha. After completing studies in mathematics and philosophy, he went to Portugal to enroll at the Universidade de Coimbra on 20 December 1782. He graduated in law on 4 May 1787, and then became a magistrate. In 1789, he served as a juiz de fora in Torres Vedras (1789). Returning to Brazil, he was an ouvidor (a type of magistrate) in Bahia and an appellate judge (desembargador) in Pernambuco in 1792. In 1798, he was a member of the interim government of Pernambuco.

In 1802, he was appointed ouvidor in Rio das Velhas, Minas Gerais. In 1803, he took office as ouvidor of Sabará, Minas Gerais, and in 1806 he was appointed Chancellor of the tribunal da relação (appellate court) of Bahia. In 1805, he was appointed judge and desembargador of the Casa da Suplicação (supreme court) in Lisbon, Portugal. In 1809 he was part of the interim government of Bahia, in a triumvirate with José de Santa Escolástica Álvares Pereira and João Baptista Vieira Godinho. In 1818, he was a deputy of the Board of Commerce, Agriculture, Manufacturing and Navigation (Junta do Comércio, Agricultura, Fábricas e Navegação).

In 1823, he was finance minister. He was Senator for Pernambuco, in the Empire of Brazil, from 1826 to 1837. At the time of his death, he was President of the Senate.

He received the titles of viscount and grandee by imperial decree of 12 October 1825, and that of marquis, by imperial decree of 12 October 1826. He was also appointed: in 1808, councillor of the Treasury (conselheiro da Fazenda); in 1809, as a Fidalgo Knight of the Imperial House (1809); as a dignitary of the Order of the Southern Cross; and in 1824, a Councillor of State (1st Council).

He was one of the negotiators on the Brazilian side for the British-Brazilian Treaty of 1826.

Awards 

  Knight of the Imperial Order of Christ, in 1802
  Knight of the Imperial Order of Christ, in 1811
  Dignitary of the Imperial Order of the Southern Cross, in 1824

References 

University of Coimbra alumni
19th-century Brazilian judges
Presidents of the Federal Senate (Brazil)
1837 deaths
1760 births
Brazilian nobility
18th-century Brazilian judges